Börnicke is a component locality (Ortsteil) of the town of Nauen in the Landkreis Havelland district of Brandenburg, Germany.

Neighbouring Cities 
 Tietzow
 Staffelde
 Günefeld
 Kienberg
 Fehrbellin

Geography 
Börnicke lies 34m above sea-level, 10 km north-east from the town Nauen. The town's area is around 19.07 km².

History 
The town's name is from the Eastphalian for "small well".

Localities in Havelland